The Special Duties Unit (SDU), nicknamed the "Flying Tigers", is the elite tactical unit of the Hong Kong Police Force tasked with countering terrorist attacks, hostage rescue, underwater search and recovery, and tackling serious crime involving firearms.

The SDU is a subdivision of the Police Tactical Unit which is part of 'A' Department (Operations & Support). The SDU is based at the Police Tactical Unit Headquarters in Fanling.

History
The SDU was established in 1974 by the British Hong Kong Government in response to the ever-increasing threat of international terrorism. The SDU, then consisting of ten odd members, used existing police weaponry and devised their own tactics.

In early 1978, the British Special Air Service sent an advisory team to Hong Kong, which was initially to evaluate the SDU and subsequently trained two land assault teams resulting in considerable changes to SDU equipment and tactics. In 1982, the British Special Boat Service sent an advisory team to Hong Kong to establish a water assault team including training in military diving.

Organisation

The Special Duties Unit consists of a support group, administration group, and the action group. The action group is the core of the SDU, further categorized into the assault team and the sniper team. 

The SDU structure consists of the following as of 2014:

 Administration Group (Headquarters) which is responsible for all administrative works, as well as providing intelligence to operations
 Action Group
 Assault Teams
 Team A, Team B, Team C (Training of SDU officers)
 Sniper Team
 Boat Team: Provides sea transportation for the assault team, and maintains the SDU fleet of small vessels
 Support Group 
 Medical Support Team: Consists of combat medics who perform operations along the assault team
 Transportation Team: Maintains the SDU fleet of land vehicles

The SDU has five Belgian Shepherd dogs.

Selection and training
A volunteer for the SDU has to successfully complete an 11-day selection course known as Hell Week which is held annually that has a success rate of only 25%. After successfully completing selection, the applicant is required to complete a nine-month training course that includes weapons handling and marksmanship, tactical movement, unarmed combat, breaching, climbing and roping, chemical, biological, radiological and nuclear incidents, and combat medicine. Applications are open to women officers, with no female officers to date. Between 1974 and 2014, 383 officers had served in the SDU.

Prior to 1998, the SDU selection course was 10 to 14 days in length with most of the emphasis placed on physical endurance. In 1998, this changed to a basic four-day selection course with more emphasis on mental attributes than physical ones. Those who successfully passed the basic selection course were given a five-week build-up course followed by a week-long advanced selection course. The course concentrated on weapons handling and use, elementary close-quarter battle, camouflage and concealment, physical fitness, observation and commentary, first aid, and map reading. For the period 1998–99, 44 officers applied with 14 selected.

Equipment and weapons

SDU officers deploy in Crye Precision G3 combat dress of various camouflage patterns depending on the environment. Officers may also deploy in plain clothes during a rapid response when there is no time to change. Armor and accessories include Ops-Core FAST ballistic helmets with attachable night-vision scopes and ear protection, MSA Advantage 1000 CBA-RCA respirators, and Dräger LAR V rebreathers (for tactical diving). Unlike many similar units around the world, most of the SDU officers do not display the word "Police" on their uniforms.

The SDU mainly uses firearms manufactured in the United States and Europe, and its latest equipment primarily include the Glock 17 handgun, the HK MP5 submachine gun, and the SIG Sauer SIG516 assault rifle. Shotguns include the Remington 870 and Benelli M1 Super 90. Snipers rifles used are the Remington 700, Knight's Armament Company SR-25, Accuracy International AXMC .338, Accuracy International AS50 and SIG Sauer SSG 3000.

In 2020, the United States, the United Kingdom, and the European Union, placed restrictions on the sale of military equipment to Hong Kong following the passing of the national security law. As a consequence, an order of 1000 replacement MPX submachine guns and SIG516 assault rifles for the SDU and other units placed in early 2021 was cancelled by SIG Sauer, and the Hong Kong police will need to source firearms elsewhere for all units, including the SDU. 

The SDU has several land vehicles including the Mercedes-Benz Unimog U5000 armoured personnel carrier, the Jankel Guardian Tactical Intervention Vehicle based on a Ford F-450 chassis, Mercedes-Benz Vario van and Man LE14.224 truck. The Government Flying Service provides aviation support with Eurocopter AS332 Super Puma and Eurocopter EC155 helicopters.

Known operations

 1992: During a raid, the Unit was met with heavy resistance by four jewel robbers armed with AK-47 assault rifles and hand grenades. Seven officers, including members of the Unit, were severely injured from a grenade blast. As a result of the incident, the Unit's Close Quarters Battle techniques were further refined to fit Hong Kong's unique urban environment and new equipment was added to the unit's arsenal. All suspects were apprehended.
 2003: Kwai Ping-hung, the most wanted person in Hong Kong, was arrested in his flat in a raid by the Unit with no shots fired. This was the most high-profile arrest made in Hong Kong's history.
 2005: During the World Trade Organization Ministerial Conference of 2005 in Hong Kong, the Unit was deployed to protect WTO delegates.
 2014: In a heavily televised standoff, the Unit was deployed to a flat in a residential skyscraper in Kowloon Bay after a disgruntled man armed with a heavy calibre pistol shot and killed another man in the building and barricaded himself in the flat. Multiple shots were exchanged, along with the use of flashbang grenades, which were clearly seen and heard on live television. Several SDU officers breached the flat through the front door while others rappelled from the roof of the skyscraper and entered the flat through the windows. By the time the officers reached the man, he had shot himself. The man later died from suicide.
 2019: During the Christchurch mosque shootings, two members of the Unit training in Christchurch helped respond to the shooting alongside local police by providing medical treatment to victims of the attacks.
 2019-2020: During the anti-extradition protests, SDU operators as part of the Special Tactical Contingent (STC) took part in dispersing and arresting protestors. STC officers were accused of using excessive force during arrests with an Amnesty International field investigation finding that the STC was responsible for "the worst violence" by the police force. Apple Daily and New Tang Dynasty Television reported that SDU operators disguised as protesters provoked fights with protestors in order for them to be arrested. Newtalk reported that SDU operators disguised as protestors committed illegal acts such as setting fire on the street as part of a false flag operation. Police arrested a Hong Kong Museum of History employee for obstruction who uploaded photos to social media of a SDU observation post in the museum that was observing the Hong Kong Polytechnic University.

See also
 Police Tactical Unit (Hong Kong Police Force)
 Airport Security Unit
 Special Tactical Squad

References

Hong Kong Police Force
Special forces of Hong Kong
Police tactical units
1974 establishments in Hong Kong